Eagris decastigma, commonly known as the purple flat, is a species of butterfly in the family Hesperiidae. It is found in Guinea, Sierra Leone, Ivory Coast, Ghana, Nigeria, Cameroon, the Republic of the Congo, Gabon, the Democratic Republic of the Congo, Sudan, Uganda, Kenya, Tanzania and Zambia. The habitat consists of paths and clearings in dense forests.

Adult males visit urine patches.

Subspecies
Eagris decastigma decastigma - Guinea, Sierra Leone, Ivory Coast, Ghana, Nigeria, Cameroon
Eagris decastigma fuscosa (Holland, 1893) - Nigeria, Cameroon, Gabon, Congo
Eagris decastigma purpura Evans, 1937 - southern Sudan, Uganda, western Kenya, western Tanzania, Zambia, Democratic Republic of Congo: north-east to Ituri

References

Butterflies described in 1891
Tagiadini
Butterflies of Africa